Ali Abo Gresha (born 29 November 1947) is a retired Egyptian football player.

Career
Abo Gresha was voted by the readers of Jeune Afrique Africa's outstanding footballer for 1971. He played club football for Ismaily. He represented the Egypt national football team on several occasions, including participating in the 1970 and 1974 African Cup of Nations, where he scored a combined 7 goals.

Following his playing career, he became a coach for Ismaily.

Titles

For Ismaily 
1 Egyptian league title 1966/67
1 African champions league title 1969

Personal 
3rd African footballer of the year by France Football 1970
8th African footballer of the year by France Football 1972
Top scorer of Egyptian League 1966/67
Top scorer of African champions league 1969

References

External links
Official website

Living people
Egyptian footballers
Egypt international footballers
Association football forwards
1970 African Cup of Nations players
1974 African Cup of Nations players
African Games medalists in football
1947 births
Footballers at the 1973 All-Africa Games